A melt sandwich is a type of hot sandwich containing cheese (sometimes grated) and some type of filling such as meat or vegetables. The sandwich is then heated until the cheese is melted.  It is the filling that establishes the melt sandwich as a variation of the grilled cheese sandwich. It may be served as an open-face sandwich or a closed-face one.

One common filling is tuna with mayonnaise (tuna salad); the result is a tuna melt. Other popular choices are ham, roast beef, chicken, turkey, or a ground beef patty, which is known as a patty melt.  Patty melts are a staple of the traditional American diner and were commonly found on menus as early as the 1940s.

See also
Croque monsieur
Gerber sandwich
Horseshoe sandwich
Hot Brown
Monte Cristo sandwich
Open sandwich
Panini
Sandwich toaster
Tuna fish sandwich
List of sandwiches

External links

References 

American sandwiches
Cheese sandwiches
Hot sandwiches